KBJI may refer to:

 Bemidji Regional Airport (ICAO code KBJI)
 KBJI-LP, a defunct low-power radio station (106.3 FM) formerly licensed to serve Bemidji, Minnesota, United States